Vovinam (short for Võ Việt Nam; literally meaning Vietnamese Martial Arts, or  (越武道), meaning Vietnamese Way of Martial Arts) is a Vietnamese martial art,
It was founded in 1938 by Nguyễn Lộc. It is based on traditional Vietnamese subjects and eclectic sources.

Vovinam involves the use of the hands, elbows, legs, knees and weapons such as swords, knives, chisels, claws, fans. Students also learn how to deal with hand-held weapons, counter-attacks, lock-ups, and levers. Amongst Vietnamese martial arts, Vovinam is the largest and most developed in Vietnam with more than 60 schools around the world, including Poland, Belgium, 
Canada, Cambodia, Denmark, Germany, the United States, Morocco, Norway, Russia, France, Romania, Switzerland, Sweden, Singapore, Uzbekistan, Thailand, Italy, Australia, India, Pakistan, Iran, Spain, Algeria, Taiwan, Greece. The Chief of Vovinam Council now is Nguyễn Văn Chiếu.

Vovinam is practiced with and without weapons. It is based on the principle of between hard and soft. It includes training of the body as well as the mind. It uses force and reaction of the opponent. Vovinam also includes hand, elbow, kicks, escape- and levering techniques. Both attack and defense techniques are trained, as well as forms, combat and traditional wrestling.
The wide range of techniques include punching, kicking, forms, wrestling, sword, staff, axe, folding fan and others.

Self-defense techniques cover defense against weaponless attacks like choking from behind and defense against attackers armed with knives or swords. Advanced students learn to combine the techniques and defend themselves against armed opponents. Instructors teach traditional weapons like the long stick, short stick, knife, sword and sabre. The weapons thus serve as training devices for reaching optimal control of body and mind.

History

Vovinam Việt Võ Đạo was founded as Vovinam by Nguyễn Lộc (1912 – 1960) in 1938, with the intent of providing practitioners with an efficient method of self-defense after a short period of study. Nguyễn believed martial arts would contribute to freeing Vietnam from colonial rule, which had been ruled by France since 1859, and from outside domination. Vovinam added elements of Chinese and Japanese systems onto traditional Vietnamese martial arts, systems, was thus created partially as a response to the French occupation, meant to promote a sense of national identity for the Vietnamese people. Hence, it is similar to taekwondo in that it is an eclectic system with combined elements of Japanese and Chinese martial arts onto an indigenous framework.

After being invited to demonstrate Vovinam publicly in Hanoi with his disciples in 1940, Nguyễn was invited to teach the art at Hanoi's Ecole Normale, and Vovinam gained in popularity. During the following years, political unrest increased throughout Vietnam; due to the system's nationalist political orientation, the art came under suppression. By 1954, Nguyễn had emigrated to South Vietnam, where he was able to continue to teach and establish Vovinam schools. After his death in 1960, Grandmaster Lê Sáng continued the development and international promotion of Vovinam until his own death on September 27, 2010. The first Vovinam school outside of Vietnam was established in Houston, Texas, by Vietnamese emigrants in 1976, after the Fall of Saigon. By 2000, Vovinam schools had been established in Australia, Belgium, Canada, France, Germany, Italy, Morocco, Poland, Spain, Switzerland, and the United States. Vovinam now exists as Vovinam Việt Võ Đạo, without the political overtones it originally carried.

Logo

The Vovinam Việt Võ Đạo logo is framed in a yellow shape composed of a rectangle conjoined with a circle, angular at the top, round at the bottom. This shape symbolizes the perfection of the hard and soft. Within this yellow shape, the red text "Vovinam" is written above the marine blue text "Việt Võ Đạo". Beneath the text appears a Âm-Dương symbol in red and marine blue. The Âm-Dương is surrounded by a thick, white circle, symbolizing the being of the Dao, with the mission to mediate between negative and positive (Âm = Negative, Dương = Positive), to subdue the two, to enable life of all beings. A yellow map of Vietnam is superimposed on the symbol.

Theory

Hard and soft
The yin and yang theory (Vietnamese: "Âm-Dương" and "Nhu-Cương") states that everything in the universe and on earth is initiated through the interrelation of Âm (negative) and Dương (positive). As to this theory there are martial arts that prefer the hard over the soft and others that prefer the soft over the hard. Vovinam Việt Võ Đạo does not prefer any over the other. Hard and soft are used equally to adapt to every situation, to every problem.

Based on Võ-Thuật, the student aims to develop the ability to combine hard and soft in combat and in daily life. This aims to develop physical abilities as well as the student's spirit.
Not only the principle of the harmony of hard and soft but also many other things resulting from the training contribute to internalizing the martial art philosophy, e.g. fighting spirit, courage, tenacity, fairness, modesty and tolerance. Above all the training in morality and the way of applying the techniques shape the students' character. Emphasis is placed on recognizing one's ego and overcoming it.

In doing so the Vovinam student will gain generosity and tolerance with other people. With the awareness that the most important thing in a human's life are other humans, the final goal is to be able to not only help oneself but also to help others to live in peace and harmony with their surroundings.

With the salutation "Iron Hand over benevolent heart", the student is reminded of the main principle and the goal of Vovinam Việt Võ Đạo with every training. It is also about using the opponent's force and reaction, reaching maximum effect with comparatively little force.

10 principles of Vovinam Việt Võ Đạo
The term Việt Võ Đạo ("the way (Dao) of Viet Vo") was coined by the patriarch of the second generation of the Vovinam Viet Vo Dao, Lê Sáng, with the objective of adding a philosophical dimension to his martial art. This "Viet Vo Dao" consists of ten principles:

 Vovinam's disciples vow to pursue high proficiency in their martial art in order to serve the people and humanity.
 Promise to be faithful to the intentions and teaching of Vovinam and develop the young generation of Vovinam Viêt Võ Dao.
 Be united in spirit and heart, respect one's elder, be kind to one's peers.
 Respect discipline absolutely, maintain the high standard of personal conduct and honour of a martial art disciple.
 Have respect for other martial art schools, only use martial art skills for self-defense and protect justice.
 Be studious, strengthen the mind, enrich one's thought & behavior.
 Live simply, with chastity, loyalty, high principles and ethics.
 Build up a spirit of steely determination and vigor, overcome powers of violence.
 Make intelligent judgments, carry out struggles with perseverance and act with alertness.
 Be self-confident, self-controlled, modest and generous.
(The wording can vary slightly between Vovinam schools)

A "Việt Võ Đạo Federation" was founded on November 3, 1973, in order to reunite some Vietnamese martial arts.  Therefore, "Việt Võ Đạo", in Europe, is also used as a generic term for certain Vietnamese martial arts and philosophies but in Vietnam is only used to refer to "Vovinam Việt Võ Đạo".

Belt system, the uniforms and the colors

Uniforms
From 1938 to 1964, there was no official uniform. Following the lifting of the ban on martial arts in Vietnam in 1963, the first Council of Vovinam-Viet Vo Dao was gathered in 1964 to codify Vovinam, establishing a rank hierarchy and uniforms and codifying the training curriculum according to rank.  The color blue was adopted as the official color for Vovinam uniforms. A separate development of the "Việt Võ Đạo Federation" in 1973 until 1990 the uniforms' color was black.

In the summer of 1990, Vovinam masters from around the world met at the International Vovinam-Viet Vo Dao Conference in California with the goal of creating a structured organization for Vovinam Việt Võ Đạo outside Vietnam (the International Vovinam-Viet Vo Dao Federation). One of the decisions was that the suit in Vovinam Việt Võ Đạo were now to be blue worldwide.

Belts

The student begins with a cyan belt - the same color as his/her suit.

 Blue stands for the factor of the sea, and the hope - the hope in being successful in learning Vovinam. With the following 3 exams, yellow stripes are added to the blue belt. The 3rd yellow stripe is followed by the yellow belt.

 Yellow stands for earth. In other martial arts this belt is black. Therefore, a Vovinam student who carries a yellow belt is allowed to carry a black belt. This makes a comparison to other martial arts easier, e.g. in public performances.   A person who wears a yellow belt with one or more red stripes is considered an instructor.

Following in a longer period of time, respectively 3 red stripes are added to the yellow belt. This corresponds to the 1st, 2nd, respectively 3rd degree blackbelt (Đẳng). The exam following the 3rd red stripe is the master's exam. Passing the exam successfully assigns the right to wear a red belt with a circulating yellow border (4th degree blackbelt).

 Red stands for the blood and the intensive flame. The student has internalized Vovinam (Việt Võ Đạo) even further. The 5th to 10th degree blackbelt are shown as a completed red belt with 1 to 6 white stripes.

 White stands for the infiniteness, the bones; is the symbol of the depth of the spirit. The white belt assigns the master the absolute mastery of Vovinam Việt Võ Đạo. On the white belt thin, lengthwise stripes in blue, black, yellow and red symbolize the whole of Vovinam (Việt Võ Đạo) again. This belt is reserved for the "Chưởng Môn".

Name plates
 With every change of belt color the name plate color changes. Blue belt students start off with yellow text on blue name plates. With the yellow belt the name plate changes to red text on yellow ground. The red belt comes along with white text on a red name plate. The patriarch carries red text on a white name plate. Thin, colored lines in blue, yellow and red are shown on the upper and lower borders of this white name plate.

Specialties

Vovinam has some specialised techniques:
 Đòn Chân Tấn Công
 A group of leg grappling techniques that is designed to grab the opponent by the feet or legs and take them down using twisting motions usable as a surprise attack in a fight. There are 21 leg grappling techniques.
 Đấm Lao
 A backfist swung reversely to the temple.
 Đá Cạnh
 A diagonally applied kick.

Techniques and weapons
 Hand techniques (đòn tay)
 Elbow techniques (chỏ)
 Kicking techniques (đá)
 Knee techniques (gối)
 Forms (Quyền, Song Luyện, Đa Luyện)
 Attack techniques  (chiến lược)
 Self-defense (tự vệ)
 Self-defense against knife attack (phản đòn dao)
 Traditional wrestling (Vật cổ truyền)
 Leg attack take-downs (đòn chân tấn công)
 Staff (côn)
 Sword (kiếm)
 Halberd (dao dài)
 Sabre (đao)
 Dagger (dao găm)
 Machete (mã tấu)
 Spear (thương)

World Championships
Vovinam has Voninam World Championships since 2002  as well as Vocotruyen World Championships.

See also
Võ Thuật
Võ thuật Bình Định
Vietnamese martial arts
Silat
Chinese Martial Arts
Vovinam University International

Notes and references

External links
 World Vovinam Federation (WVVF)
 European Vovinam Federation (EVVF)
 US Vovinam Federation
 Vovinam University International

Vietnamese martial arts
Individual sports
Combat sports